Pam Shriver was the four-time defending champion but lost in the final 6–2, 6–1 against Claudia Kohde-Kilsch.

Seeds
A champion seed is indicated in bold text while text in italics indicates the round in which that seed was eliminated. The top nine seeds received a bye to the second round.

  Pam Shriver (final)
  Claudia Kohde-Kilsch (champion)
  Lori McNeil (semifinals)
  Zina Garrison (semifinals)
  Larisa Savchenko (third round)
 n/a
  Anne Minter (quarterfinals)
  Nathalie Tauziat (third round)
  Leila Meskhi (second round)
  Etsuko Inoue (second round)
  Elly Hakami (first round)
  Isabelle Demongeot (first round)
  Gigi Fernández (first round)
  Rosalyn Fairbank (third round)

Draw

Finals

Top half

Section 1

Section 2

Bottom half

Section 3

Section 4

References
 1988 Dow Classic Draws
 ITF tournament page
 ITF singles results page

Birmingham Classic (tennis)
1988 WTA Tour